George Duke Humphrey (August 30, 1897 – September 10, 1973) was the President of the Mississippi State College (now Mississippi State University) from 1934 to 1945. He then became the president of the University of Wyoming from 1945 to 1964.

Honors
The University of Wyoming has an annual faculty teaching award named in his honor.

The Humphrey Coliseum at Mississippi State is named in his honor.

See also
University of Wyoming
List of presidents of Mississippi State University

References

External links
Gallery of the Presidents
George Humphrey, University of Wyoming

Presidents of Mississippi State University
1897 births
1973 deaths
Presidents of the University of Wyoming
20th-century American academics